Kong Xianjing (born 4 January 1952) is a Chinese engineer and academician of the Chinese Academy of Engineering, formerly served as deputy party secretary and vice president of Dalian University of Technology.

Biography 
Kong was born in Nanjing, Jiangsu, on 4 January 1952, while his ancestral home in Jining, Shandong. He earned a bachelor's degree in 1980, a master's degree in 1983, and a doctor's degree in 1990, all from Dalian Institute of Technology (now Dalian University of Technology).

After graduating from Dalian Institute of Technology in 1980, he stayed at the university and worked successively as associate professor (1990), full professor (1992), and doctoral supervisor (1995). He served as assistant to the president from March 1998 to March 1999 and the university's vice president from March 1999 to January 2002. In January 2002, he was appointed deputy party secretary of the university. After this office was terminated in March 2009, he became executive party secretary, serving until May 2012.

Honours and awards 
 1999 State Science and Technology Progress Award (Third Class)
 2010 State Science and Technology Progress Award (Second Class)
 2012 State Science and Technology Progress Award (Second Class)
 27 November 2017 Member of the Chinese Academy of Engineering (CAE)

References 

1952 births
Living people
People from Nanjing
Engineers from Jiangsu
Dalian University of Technology alumni
Academic staff of Dalian University of Technology
Members of the Chinese Academy of Engineering